Külasema  is a village in Muhu Parish, Saare County in western Estonia.

Writer Aadu Hint (1910–1989) was born in Külasema.

References

 

Villages in Saare County